Karl Zuchardt (10 February 1887 – 12 November 1968) was a German writer of historical novels.

Zuchardt was born in Leipzig, Kingdom of Saxony. In 1961 he received the Martin Andersen Nexø-Arts-Award from the city of Dresden, where he later died.

Books by Zuchardt include Der Spiessrutenlauf, Stirb Du Narr! (an account of Sir Thomas More's political life), and Wie lange noch Bonaparte?

1887 births
1968 deaths
Writers from Leipzig
German historical novelists
German male novelists
20th-century German novelists
20th-century German male writers